Syrian literature is literature originating from present-day Syria (officially the "Syrian Arabic Republic"), and which may be written in any of the languages of Syria. Syrian literature has been influenced by the country's political history and by Arabic and French literature.

From early times to 1948

Under Ottoman rule, literary production was subjected to censorship. In the second half of the nineteenth century and the early twentieth, aspiring Syrian writers often chose emigration, moving primarily to Egypt—where they contributed to al-Nahda, the renaissance of Arabic literature—and to the United States, developing Syrian literature from abroad.

From 1920 to 1946, while Syria was under French rule, French Romantic influences inspired Syrian authors, many of whom turned away from the traditional models of Arabic poetry.

From 1948 to the present day
In 1948, the partitioning of neighbouring Palestine and the establishment of Israel brought about a new turning point in Syrian writing. Adab al-Iltizam, the "literature of political commitment", deeply marked by social realism, mostly replaced the romantic trend of the previous decades. Hanna Mina, rejecting art for art's sake and confronting the social and political issues of his time, was one of the most prominent Syrian novelists of this era. Following the Six-Day War in 1967, Adab al-Naksa, the "literature of defeat", grappled with the causes of the Arab defeat.

Baath Party rule, since the 1966 coup, has brought about renewed censorship. As Hanadi Al-Samman puts it,
"In the face of threats of persecution or imprisonment, most of Syria's writers had to make a choice between living a life of artistic freedom in exile-as do Nizar Kabbani, Ghada al-Samman, Hamida Na'na', Salim Barakat, and prominent poet, critic, and novelist 'Ali Ahmad Sa'id (Adonis)-or resorting to subversive modes of expression that seemingly comply with the demands of the authoritarian police state while undermining and questioning the legitimacy of its rule through subtle literary techniques and new genres".

In this context, the genre of the historical novel, spearheaded by Nabil Sulayman, Fawwaz Haddad, Khyri al-Dhahabi and Nihad Siris, is sometimes used as a means of expressing dissent, critiquing the present through a depiction of the past. Syrian folk narrative, as a subgenre of historical fiction, is imbued with magical realism, and is also used as a means of veiled criticism of the present. Salim Barakat, a Syrian émigré living in Sweden, is one of the leading figures of the genre.

Contemporary Syrian literature also encompasses science fiction and futuristic utopiae (Nuhad Sharif, Talib Umran), which may also serve as media of dissent.

Mohja Kahf has argued that literary dissent is typically expressed through the "poetics of Syrian silence":
"The nostalgic, moist-eyed silences of Ulfat Idilbi's narrative could not be more different from the chilling, cynical silences in Zakaria Tamer's stories. The impassioned lacunae in Nizar Kabbani's proclaim exactly what it is they are not saying explicitly, while the poet Muhammad al-Maghut's silence is sardonic, sneering both at the authorities and at himself, at the futility and absurdity of the human situation under authoritarian rule".

See also
 Syrian writers
 Culture of Syria
 History of Syria
 Politics of Syria

References
 Hanadi al-Samman, "Syria", in Literature from the "Axis of Evil" (a Words Without Borders anthology), 2006, pp. 175–178.
 Mohja Kahf, "The Silences of Contemporary Syrian Literature: Is there a Syrian literature?", in World Literature Today 75, n°2, (Spring 2001), p. 231.

External links
 Nihad Siris' Novel Ali Hassan's Intrigue